Heather O'Donoghue is a British academic. She is Professor of Old Norse and Vigfusson Rausing Reader in Ancient Icelandic Literature and Antiquities at the University of Oxford. She is a Fellow of Linacre College, Oxford.

Selected publications 

O'Donoghue's books include:

References 

Living people
Fellows of Linacre College, Oxford
Year of birth missing (living people)
Place of birth missing (living people)
British literary historians
Women literary historians
British antiquarians